Dušan Klein (21 June 1939 – 9 January 2022) was a Czech film director and screenwriter. He died on 9 January 2022, at the age of 82.

Filmography
How the World Is Losing Poets
How Poets Are Losing Their Illusions
How Poets Are Enjoying Their Lives

References

1939 births
2022 deaths
Holocaust survivors
Theresienstadt Ghetto survivors
Czech film directors
Czech Jews
Academy of Performing Arts in Prague alumni
Academic staff of the Academy of Performing Arts in Prague
People from Michalovce